Christopher A. Coes is an American political advisor serving as the Assistant Secretary of Transportation for Transportation Policy. On April 14, 2021, Coes was nominated to serve in that position. On April 22, 2021, his nomination was sent to the Senate. He was confirmed on May 26, 2022.

Education 
Coes earned a Bachelor of Arts and Master of Arts in politics and government from St. John's University.

Career 
After earning his master's degree, Coes worked as Transportation for America and the Democratic Congressional Campaign Committee. He was also a government affairs and campaign consultant for M+R Strategic Services. At Smart Growth America, Coes was vice president for real estate policy and external affairs and vice president for land use and development. Since 2016, Coes has been the COO of TOD Finance and Advisors, Inc. Since 2020, Coes has also been a professor at the George Washington University School of Business and a nonresident senior fellow at the Brookings Institution.

References

External links

Living people
St. John's University (New York City) alumni
United States Department of Transportation officials
Biden administration personnel
1984 births